"Beautiful Goodbye" is a song co-written and recorded by American country music artist Jennifer Hanson.  It was released in July 2002 as the first single from her debut album Jennifer Hanson.  The song was written by Hanson and Kim Patton-Johnston.

History
The senior vice president of marketing for Capitol Records' Nashville division at the time, Fletcher Foster, said that the song was "uniquely different and could set her apart from not only all the other new artists but also the acts out there in general." Phyllis Stark of Billboard compared the song to Sheryl Crow.

Chart performance
"Beautiful Goodbye" debuted at number 58 on the U.S. Billboard Hot Country Songs chart for the week of August 3, 2002.

References

2002 debut singles
2002 songs
Jennifer Hanson songs
Song recordings produced by Greg Droman
Songs written by Kim McLean
Songs written by Jennifer Hanson
Capitol Records Nashville singles